In mathematics, and more specifically in analysis, a holonomic function is a smooth function of several variables that is a solution of a system of linear homogeneous differential equations with polynomial coefficients and satisfies a suitable dimension condition in terms of D-modules theory.  More precisely, a holonomic function is an element of a holonomic module of smooth functions.  Holonomic functions can also be described as differentiably finite functions, also known as D-finite functions.  When a power series in the variables is the Taylor expansion of a holonomic function, the sequence of its coefficients, in one or several indices, is also called holonomic.  Holonomic sequences are also called P-recursive sequences: they are defined recursively by multivariate recurrences satisfied by the whole sequence and by suitable specializations of it.  The situation simplifies in the univariate case: any univariate sequence that satisfies a linear homogeneous recurrence relation with polynomial coefficients, or equivalently a linear homogeneous difference equation with polynomial coefficients, is holonomic.

Holonomic functions and sequences in one variable

Definitions

Let  be a field of characteristic 0 (for example,  or ).

A function  is called D-finite (or holonomic) if there exist polynomials  such that

holds for all x. This can also be written as  where

The quantity r is called the order of the annihilating operator. By extension, the holonomic function f is said to be of order r when an annihilating operator of such order exists.

A sequence  is called P-recursive (or holonomic) if there exist polynomials  such that

holds for all n. This can also be written as  where

The quantity r is called the order of the annihilating operator. By extension, the holonomic sequence c is said to be of order r when an annihilating operator of such order exists.

Holonomic functions are precisely the generating functions of holonomic sequences: if  is holonomic, then the coefficients  in the power series expansion

form a holonomic sequence. Conversely, for a given holonomic sequence , the function defined by the above sum is holonomic (this is true in the sense of formal power series, even if the sum has a zero radius of convergence).

Closure properties

Holonomic functions (or sequences) satisfy several closure properties. In particular, holonomic functions (or sequences) form a ring. They are not closed under division, however, and therefore do not form a field.

  (the Cauchy product of the sequences)
  (the Hadamard product of the sequences)
 
 
 , where  is any algebraic function. However,  is generally not holonomic.

Examples of holonomic functions and sequences

Examples of holonomic functions include:

 all algebraic functions, including polynomials and rational functions
 the sine and cosine functions (but not tangent, cotangent, secant, or cosecant)
the hyperbolic sine and cosine functions (but not hyperbolic tangent, cotangent, secant, or cosecant)
 exponential functions and logarithms (to any base)
 the error function 
 the Airy functions , 

The class of holonomic functions is a strict superset of the class of hypergeometric functions. Examples of special functions that are holonomic but not hypergeometric include the Heun functions.

Examples of holonomic sequences include:

 the sequence of Fibonacci numbers , and more generally, all constant-recursive sequences
 the sequence of factorials 
 the sequence of binomial coefficients  (as functions of either n or k)
 the sequence of harmonic numbers , and more generally  for any integer m
 the sequence of Catalan numbers
 the sequence of Motzkin numbers.
 the sequence of derangements.

Hypergeometric functions, Bessel functions, and classical orthogonal polynomials, in addition to being holonomic functions of their variable, are also holonomic sequences with respect to their parameters. For example, the Bessel functions  and  satisfy the second-order linear recurrence .

Examples of nonholonomic functions and sequences

Examples of nonholonomic functions include:

 the function 
 the function tan(x) + sec(x)
 the quotient of two holonomic functions is generally not holonomic.

Examples of nonholonomic sequences include:

 the Bernoulli numbers
 the numbers of alternating permutations
 the numbers of integer partitions
 the numbers 
 the numbers  where 
 the prime numbers
 the enumerations of irreducible and connected permutations.

Holonomic functions in several variables

Algorithms and software

Holonomic functions are a powerful tool in computer algebra. A holonomic function or sequence can be represented by a finite amount of data, namely an annihilating operator and a finite set of initial values, and the closure properties allow carrying out operations such as equality testing, summation and integration in an algorithmic fashion. In recent years, these techniques have allowed giving automated proofs of a large number of special function and combinatorial identities.

Moreover, there exist fast algorithms for evaluating holonomic functions to arbitrary precision at any point in the complex plane, and for numerically computing any entry in a holonomic sequence.

Software for working with holonomic functions includes:
 The HolonomicFunctions  package for Mathematica, developed by Christoph Koutschan, which supports computing closure properties and proving identities for univariate and multivariate holonomic functions
 The algolib  library for Maple, which includes the following packages:
 gfun, developed by Bruno Salvy, Paul Zimmermann and Eithne Murray, for univariate closure properties and proving 
 mgfun, developed by Frédéric Chyzak, for multivariate closure properties and proving 
 numgfun, developed by Marc Mezzarobba, for numerical evaluation

See also
Dynamic Dictionary of Mathematical functions, an online software, based on holonomic functions for automatically studying many classical and special functions (evaluation at a point, Taylor series and asymptotic expansion to any user-given precision, differential equation, recurrence for the coefficients of the Taylor series, derivative, indefinite integral, plotting, ...)

Notes

References

.

 (ITI Series preprint)

Ordinary differential equations
Special functions
Types of functions